Aiyekire (or Gbonyin) is a Local Government Area of Ekiti State, Nigeria.

The Geographical entity known as Gbonyin Local Government was created on October 1, 1996, out of Ekiti East Local Government having High Chief Zacheaus Adebowale Ofi as the pioneer chairman. Upon the creation of Ekiti State on October 1, 1996, Gbonyin Local Government (officially named Ayekire in the 1999 Constitution of the Federal Republic of Nigeria) is one of the sixteen Local Governments created with the headquarters at Ode Ekiti.

The Local Government is predominantly a homogeneous society and carefully populated by Yoruba speaking people of the South West Zone of Nigeria. 
The Religions are mainly Christian and Islamic while a percentage of the people are Traditional religion worshipers.

The Local Government is made up of 8 major towns and several villages. All the towns have recognized traditional rulers (Obas).

Geographical Landscape

The Local Government Council Area was located in the North Eastern part of Ekiti State and covers about 391 kilometer squares. 
The local government shared territorial boundaries with seven local government viz; Ise/Emure, Ekiti East, Ikole, Irepodun/Ifelodun and Ado Ekiti Local government in Ekiti State, and Akoko-North/West Local government of Ondo State.

The local government council secretariat was located in the East of Ode Ekiti via the Egbe-Isinbode road.

Population

According to the 2006 National Population Census figure, the total population of the local government was 147,999; Male: 75,459; Female: 72,734.

Major towns
 Ode Ekiti
 Agbado Ekiti
 Imesi Ekiti
 Aisegba Ekiti
 Egbe Ekiti
 Ijan Ekiti
 Iluomoba Ekiti
 Iro Ekiti.

Villages 
 Aba Baale
 Aba Jioba
 Ugboeku
 Oke Afa
 Onibedo Camp
 Alarierin
 Surulere Camp
 Aba Oka
 Oguniyi
 Aba Oka
 Isarun Better Life Road
 Ilupeju
 Imoru Mayegun
 The Apostolic Church, Alarudu
 Ologoji Farm Settlement
 Momo Farm Settlement
 Iro Ayeteju; Ijege/Oke Agbani
 Iro-Ayeteju/Egbe; Aponyinbo
 Odi-Olowo
 Apomo
 Ese
 Sakunmi
 Olorunda 
 Ipole 
 Awara 
 and more

Commerce & Industries

The thriving industries in the local government include Timber/Saw mills, rice processing, Garri processing, Palm oil, Kernel processing, Block making, Bakeries, Furnitures, Petrol Stations, Hotels, Printing Press and Banking.

Furthermore, the youths in the local government area are engaged in motor cycle repair, carpentry, fashion designing, hair dressing, small farm holds and petty trading, commercial motorcycle transportation called Okada etc.

Places of Interest
 Little Ose/Ogbe Dam
 Oloke Rock at Ode
 Forest Reserve at Egbe
 Apariko Dam at Aisegba
 Omi Agbahan at Iluomoba
 Orisa Gbamo at Agbado
 Ujilogun at Ijan

Education
There are 46 public primary schools, 18 private nursery and primary schools, 12 public secondary schools, 13 private secondary schools in the local government.

Public primary schools

Lower Holy Trinity, Aisegba Ekiti
Upper Holy Trinity, Aisegba Ekiti
St. James Primary School, Imesi Ekiti
St. Paul's Primary School, Ijan Ekiti
 Methodist Primary School, Egbe Ekiti
St. Mary's Primary School, Ode Ekiti
St. James Primary School, Ijan Ekiti
Methodist Primary School, Ode Ekiti
Lower Emmanuel Primary School, Agbado Ekiti
St. Luke Primary School, Iro Ekiti
St. Cyprian Primary School, Aisegba Ekiti
St. John Primary School, Ode Ekiti
St. Michael Primary School, Iluomoba Ekiti
St. Paul's Primary School, Agbado Ekiti
St. Peter's Primary School, Iluomoba
Upper Emmanuel Primary School, Agbado Ekiti
L. A. Odiolowo, Imesi Ekiti
St. Saviour Primary School, iro Ayeteju Ekiti
Community primary School, Bolorunduro, Aisegba Ekiti
Community Primary School, Ilupeju, Ijan
 A.U.D. Primary School Agbado ekiti
A.U.D. Primary School, Ode Ekiti
CAC Primary School, Ausegba Ekiti
Community Primary School, Ajebamidele, Iluomoba
Community Primary School, Olorunda, Imesi Ekiti
St. Francis Primary School, Imesi Ekiti
Community Primary School, Iploe Agbado ekiti
CAC Primary School, Imesi Ekiti
St. Silas Primary School, Ijan Ekiti
AUD Primary School, Aisegba Ekiti
CAC Primary School, Egbe Ekiti
Community Primary School, Agbonkoji, Egbe Ekiti
Muslim Primary School, Ijan Ekiti
St. John Primary School, Iluomoba Ekiti
St. Victor Primary School, Aisegba Ekiti
St Michael Primary School Ode Ekiti
Community Primary School, Surulere Ode Ekiti
Community Primary School, Aponu, Imesi Ekiti
CAC Primary School, Iluomoba Ekiti
C&S Primary School, Aisegba Ekiti
C&S Primary School Agbado ekiti
St. Ang. Primary School, Ijan Ekiti
CAC Primary School, Iro Ekiti
Community Primary School, Abajioba, Ode Ekiti
Celestial Primary School, Aisegba Ekiti
CAC Ijan Ekiti

Private Primary Schools
Sterling Nursery and Primary School, Ode Ekiti
United Nursery and Primary School, Ode Ekiti
Gofamint Nursery and Primary School, Ode Ekiti
Christ Majesty Nursery and Primary School, Ode Ekiti
God's Grace Nursery and Primary School, Aisegba Ekiti
Jobabeg Primary School, Aisegba Ekiti
Ife Oluwa Nursery and Primary School, Aisegba Ekiti
Excellent Gateway Nursery and Primary School, Aisegba Ekiti
Oluwafunmilayo Nursery and Primary School, Imesi Ekiti
Toluwa Nursery and Primary School, Imesi Ekiti
Emmanuel Nursery and Primary School, Agbado Ekiti
Titilola Nursery and Primary School, Agbado Ekiti
Bosotos Nursery and Primary School, Agbado Ekiti
Scyro Nursery and Primary School, Agbado Ekiti
Life Nursery and Primary School, Agbado Ekiti
Oluwaseyi Nursery and Primary School, Egbe Ekiti
Omotola Nursery and Primary School, Iluomoba Ekiti
Ranti Nursery and Primary School, Iluomoba Ekiti
Over To God Nursery and Primary School, Egbe-Ekiti

Public Secondary Schools
Ode High School, Ode Ekiti
Aisegba Community Grammar School, Aisegba Ekiti
Ojugbaye Comprehensive High School, Imesi Ekiti
Ijanmodu Comprehensive High School, Ijan Ekiti
Ileowuro High School, Agbado Ekiti
Community Grammar School, Iulomoba Ekiti\
Methodist High School, Egbe Ekiti
Comprehensive High School, Aisegba Ekiti
Sola Babalola Memorial High School, Iro Ekiti
Ayeteju Comprehensive High School, Iro Ekiti
Ayo Daramola Grammar School, Ijan Ekiti
New Era College, Ode Ekiti

Private Secondary Schools
Faith and Love College, Ode Ekiti
Tasco Secondary School, Ode Ekiti
Amazing Grace Secondary School, Ode Ekiti
Christ the Answer College, Aisegba Ekiti
JOBABEC Secondary School, Aisegba Ekiti
God Grace Secondary School, Aisegba Ekiti
Christ International College, Agbado Ekiti
Royal Academic College, Agbado Ekiti

Health Care

Health Facilities
Comprehensive Health Centre, Ode Ekiti
Comprehensive Health Centre, Agbado Ekiti
Comprehensive Health Centre, Aisegba Ekiti
Comprehensive Health Centre, Imesi Ekiti
Comprehensive Health Centre, Ijan Ekiti
Basic Health Centre, Ode Ekiti
Basic Health Centre, Agbado Ekiti
Basic Health Centre, Ipole
Basic Health Centre, Aisegba Ekiti
Basic Health Centre, Bolorunduro
Basic Health Centre, Iluomoba Ekiti
Basic Health Centre, Ajebamidele
Basic Health Centre, Ijan Ekiti II
Basic Health Centre, Ilupeju
Basic Health Centre, Egbe Ekiti
Basic Health Centre, Iro Ekiti
Basic Health Centre, Iro Ayeteju
Staff Clinic
Model Health Centre, Ode Ekiti

Private Hospitals
Opeyemi Clinic and Maternity, Agbado-Ekiti
Biotom Medical Clinic and Maternity, Aisegba Ekiti
Evangelic Church of West Africa (ECWA) Hospital, Egbe Ekiti
Biotom Medical Clinic and Maternity, Ijan Ekiti
Oluseyi Clinic and Maternity, Iluomoba Ekiti
Ile Olaolu Clinic, Imesi Ekiti

 
The postal code of the area is 370.

References

Local Government Areas in Ekiti State